Serdaraly Ataýew (also spelled Serdarali Atayev, born December 14, 1984) is a professional Turkmen football player who played in Nebitçi FT. He is former member of Turkmenistan national football team.

Club career
Started his career in futsal. Best futsal player of Turkmenistan 2010 with Hereket.

Played in the Championship of Uzbekistan for FK Dinamo Samarqand.

He won the 2013 Turkmenistan Cup with FC Ahal, scoring the winning goal at the final. In 2014, he won the Turkmenistan Super Cup.

He spent the season of 2018 for the FC Alga Bishkek in the championship of Kyrgyzstan. Scored 12 goals.

In 2019, he returned to Turkmenistan, again becoming a Şagadam FK player.

Serdaraly Ataýew joined Energetik FK in January 2020. After unsuccessful trials at Energetik FK Serdaraly Ataýew signed contract with Nebitçi FT in August 2020.

International career
He played for Turkmenistan national futsal team at 2010 AFC Futsal Championship.

Ataýew made his debut for  Turkmenistan national football team on 11 June 2015 against Guam.

International goals
Scores and results list Turkmenistan's goal tally first.

Honours
 Turkmenistan Cup:
Winner: 2013

 Turkmenistan Super Cup:
Winner: 2014

References

External links
 
 

Living people
1984 births
Turkmenistan footballers
Association football forwards
Turkmenistan international footballers
Turkmenistan expatriate sportspeople in Kyrgyzstan
Kyrgyz Premier League players
FC Alga Bishkek players